Jan Lidral (19 March 1929 in Hluboká nad Vltavou, Czechoslovakia – 24 January 1982 in České Budějovice, Czechoslovakia) was a Czech ice hockey player who competed in the 1952 Winter Olympics.

References

External links
 

1929 births
1982 deaths
Czech ice hockey defencemen
Ice hockey players at the 1952 Winter Olympics
Olympic ice hockey players of Czechoslovakia
People from Hluboká nad Vltavou
HC Karlovy Vary players
Motor České Budějovice players
HC Vítkovice players
Sportspeople from the South Bohemian Region
Czechoslovak ice hockey defencemen